Lynda Lehmann (born 14 November 1958) is an Australian sprint canoeist who competed in the early to mid-1990s. Competing in two Summer Olympics, she earned her best finish of eighth in the K-4 500 m event twice (1992, 1996).

References
Sports-Reference.com profile

1958 births
Australian female canoeists
Canoeists at the 1992 Summer Olympics
Canoeists at the 1996 Summer Olympics
Living people
Olympic canoeists of Australia